Christopher Ryan Anderson (born July 29, 1992) is a retired professional baseball pitcher. The Los Angeles Dodgers selected him in the 1st round of the 2013 Major League Baseball Draft, and he signed with the team on June 12, 2013, for a signing bonus of $2,109,900.

Career

Amateur career
Anderson attended Centennial High School in Blaine, Minnesota, where he was a two-year starter as a pitcher and first baseman. As a senior, he went 6–1 with a 1.86 ERA while batting .437. He was named All-Conference, All-State, was Minnesota's contender for Gatorade Player of the Year, and was named Minnesota's Mr. Baseball award winner for the 2010 high school season. He was also a two-year starter at quarterback for the football team. The Chicago Cubs drafted him in the 35th round of the 2010 MLB Draft, but he did not sign.

Anderson attended Jacksonville University. In 2012, he played collegiate summer baseball with the Yarmouth–Dennis Red Sox of the Cape Cod Baseball League. As a junior at Jacksonville, he went 7–5 with 101 strikeouts and a 2.49 ERA in 104 2/3 innings. 

The Los Angeles Dodgers selected him in the 1st round of the 2013 Major League Baseball Draft, with the 18th overall selection. He was the first player from Jacksonville University to be selected in the first round of the Major League Baseball Draft.

Professional career
He made his professional debut with the Great Lakes Loons of the Midwest League on June 26, 2013. He made 12 starts with the Loons in his debut season, and was 3–0 with a 1.96 ERA. Anderson was promoted to the Rancho Cucamonga Quakes of the California League for 2014. In 27 games (25 starts) for the Quakes, he was 7–7 with a 4.62 ERA. His 146 strikeouts on the season was tops among all Dodger minor leaguers. The Dodgers invited him to attend major league spring training in 2015. He was assigned to the AA Tulsa Drillers of the Texas League to start the 2015 season and was named to the mid-season All-Star team. He made 23 starts for Tulsa and was 9–7 with a 4.05 ERA. He was promoted to the AAA Oklahoma City Dodgers in late August for a try out in the bullpen with the potential to be promoted to the majors in a bullpen role. He appeared in three games for them and allowed 15 runs in  innings and was not called up. He was given a non-roster invitation to Dodgers spring training in 2016. He returned to Tulsa to begin the 2016 season. He made 18 appearances with Tulsa (six starts) and was 3–6 with a 5.90 ERA before he was demoted back to the Quakes for the bulk of the season. With Rancho Cucamonga, he was 1–2 in 18 appearances and a 3.25 ERA. After the season, the Dodgers assigned him to the Glendale Desert Dogs of the Arizona Fall League. He was released by the Dodgers on April 4, 2017.

Anderson signed as a free agent with the Minnesota Twins. They released him on May 15 after only three minor league games.

References

External links

Living people
1992 births
Baseball pitchers
Great Lakes Loons players
Rancho Cucamonga Quakes players
Tulsa Drillers players
Oklahoma City Dodgers players
Glendale Desert Dogs players
Jacksonville Dolphins baseball players
Yarmouth–Dennis Red Sox players
People from Lino Lakes, Minnesota
Fort Myers Miracle players
Baseball players from Minnesota